3-Hydroxyacetophenone is a chemical compound. It is a component of castoreum, the exudate from the castor sacs of the mature beaver.

Related compounds 
Humans excrete small amounts of conjugated 2-amino-3-hydroxyacetophenone, a product of tryptophan metabolism, in the urine.

The plant Chrysothamnus viscidiflorus (Asteraceae) contains an m-hydroxyacetophenone named viscidone.

See also 
 4-Hydroxyacetophenone

References 

Phenols
Aromatic ketones